Copeton is a small rural locality in the Gwydir Shire and Inverell Shire of New South Wales, Australia.

References

North West Slopes
Towns in New South Wales
Towns in New England (New South Wales)